Gador may refer to 

 Gádor, a municipality of Almería province, Andalusia, Spain
 Gádor, former Hungarian name of Gakovo, Serbia
 Gadore, a town in Las Bela District, Pakistan
 Tel Gador, an archaeological site (tell) south of Hadera, Israel

See also

Sierra de Gádor, mountain range in the province of Almería, Spain